Paul Weschke (1867–1940) was a famous German trombonist. He was solo trombonist for the Staatskapelle Berlin from 1895 to 1929. In addition he taught at the Staatliche Akademische Hochschule für Musik in Berlin from 1903 to 1934.

External links
 Article by Tony Parsons

German classical trombonists
Male trombonists
1867 births
1940 deaths